Evolver is an album by The Mammals, released in 2002 (see 2002 in music).

Evolver is the band's first studio album and the second released, along with the live compilation album Born Live. Evolver was recorded at Humble Abode Music by Max Feldman with guest appearances by Ken Maiuri, Jay Ungar, Pete Seeger and more.

Track listing
"Way Down the Old Plank Road" Traditional - 2:29
"House Carpenter/Pipeline" Rodriguez, Seeger ... - 4:30
"69 Pleasant St." Merenda - 4:06
"John Brown's Dream" Traditional - 4:05
"1952 Vincent Black Lightning Thompson - 4:16
'Lady Margaret" Traditional - 3:55
"Stairway to the Stars" Malneck, Parish, Signorelli - 2:39
"Wandering Boy" Merenda, Traditional - 2:36
"Chinese Irishman" Rodriguez, Seeger - 3:09
"Infinity Medley: Hook 'N' Line/Martha Campbell/Yellow Barber/Shiverin'" Merenda, Traditional - 10:45
"Profit" Merenda, Ungar - 3:52
"City Never Sleeps" Ungar - 4:26
"Haircut Money" Merenda, Ungar - 3:34
"Industrial Park" Eisenhower, James, Rodriguez ... - 6:01

References

2002 albums